The 2015 Quaker State 400 was a NASCAR Sprint Cup Series race held on July 11, 2015 at Kentucky Speedway in Sparta, Kentucky. Contested over 267 laps on the 1.5 mile (4 km) speedway, it was the 18th race of the 2015 NASCAR Sprint Cup Series season. Kyle Busch won the race, his second of the season. Joey Logano finished second. Denny Hamlin finished third. Carl Edwards and Matt Kenseth rounded out the top five.

With qualifying canceled for bad weather, Kyle Larson was awarded the first starting spot. He failed to lead a single lap and finished a disappointing 35th after cutting down a tire and crashing out late in the race. Busch led a race high of 163 laps on his way to winning the race. The race had 13 lead changes among eight different drivers, as well as a new track record of eleven caution flag periods for 49 laps.

This was the 31st career victory for Kyle Busch, second at Kentucky Speedway, and third at the track for Joe Gibbs Racing. This win moved Busch up to 35th in the points, 87 points behind Cole Whitt for the 30th place Chase for the Sprint Cup cutoff, and 492 behind points leader Kevin Harvick. Despite being the winning manufacturer, Toyota left Kentucky trailing Chevrolet by 83 points in the manufacturer standings.

The Quaker State 400 was carried by NBC Sports on the cable/satellite NBCSN station for the American television audience. The radio broadcast for the race was carried by the Performance Racing Network and Sirius XM NASCAR Radio.

Report

Background

Kentucky Speedway is a  tri-oval speedway in Sparta, Kentucky, which has hosted ARCA, NASCAR and Indy Racing League racing annually since it opened in 2000. The track is currently owned and operated by Speedway Motorsports, Inc. and Jerry Carroll, who, along with four other investors, owned Kentucky Speedway until 2008. The speedway has a grandstand capacity of 117,000.

Construction of the speedway began in 1998 and was completed in mid-2000. The speedway has hosted the Camping World Truck Series, Xfinity Series, IndyCar Series, and the Firestone Indy Lights Series and most recently, the Sprint Cup Series beginning in 2011.

Kevin Harvick entered Kentucky with a 63-point lead over Dale Earnhardt Jr. Jimmie Johnson entered 67 back, Joey Logano entered 75 back, and Martin Truex Jr. entered 87 back.

New aero package
On June 16, NASCAR announced that a new aero package would be used for this weekend's race at Kentucky Speedway. The changes included a smaller rear spoiler and other adjustments that significantly reduced aerodynamic downforce. In addition, tires supplied by Goodyear provided drivers with more grip. "We want to see more lead changes on the racetrack," NASCAR Executive Vice-President and Chief Racing Development Officer Steve O'Donnell said in a media teleconference. "We'll evaluate that and a number of different factors coming out of Kentucky, see what we can learn and implement down the road." Originally, the package was to be used at this year's All-Star Race, but the plan was scrubbed and NASCAR opted to use the package for a points race. "Let me be clear. This is not a test, this is a race," O'Donnell said of the rules package that was in effect for the 18th round of the 2015 Sprint Cup Series. "We've had an extensive testing plan with the industry over the last 18 months. We wouldn't implement this if we didn't feel confident as an industry to implement it at Kentucky."

Tire allotment
For this weekend's race, teams were given nine sets of Goodyear tires versus the normal allotment of eleven.

Entry list
The entry list for the Quaker State 400 was released on Monday, July 6 at 2:19 p.m. Eastern time. Forty-six drivers were entered for the race. All but the No. 30 Chevrolet of The Motorsports Group were entered for the previous week's Coke Zero 400. The three driver changes for this week were Will Kimmel in the No. 32 Go FAS Racing Ford, Alex Kennedy in the No. 33 Hillman-Circle Sport LLC Chevrolet, and Reed Sorenson in the No. 62 Premium Motorsports Chevrolet.

First practice

Qualifying

Three rounds of knockout qualifying were to take place at 5:45 p.m., but the threat of rain forced NASCAR to cancel qualifying. The field was set by first practice speeds. As a result, Kyle Larson earned the first starting spot. "I was glad we got a little track time there," Larson said. "I was quick off of the truck, which I was proud of the team for...I was able to lay down a real fast lap, went back to race trim and was fast there, too." Along with Travis Kvapil and Michael McDowell, Ryan Blaney and the Wood Brothers Racing team failed to qualify for the second week in a row. "We've gone a long time and not missed a race with weather," said co-owner Eddie Wood. "Now, the numbers seem to be leveling out. If you're slow and you miss a race because you're not fast enough, it's a bad deal. That kills your soul, but you can't do anything about the weather. We're gonna run next week at Loudon (N.H.), so we'll head up that way and hope we don't get rained out. I'm going to stop looking at weather apps, I can tell you that."

In his weekly appearance on the Sirius XM NASCAR Radio program The Morning Drive the Monday after the race, NASCAR Executive Vice-President and Chief Racing Officer Steve O'Donnell explained to Mike Bagley and Pete Pistone NASCAR's decision to cancel qualifying despite the final practice session being held at the time qualifying was scheduled to be held. He told them that NASCAR "could probably have done a better job of explaining it."

Starting lineup

Final practice

Race

First half

Start
The race was scheduled to start at 7:45 p.m. EDT but started two minutes later when Kyle Larson led the field to the green flag. He lost the lead to Brad Keselowski, who would lead the first lap. This would drop him to third place. The first caution of the race flew on lap 19 when J. J. Yeley, running on the outside, got loose and made contact with Josh Wise in turn 3, sending him into the wall. None of the leaders would pit under this caution, as they all stayed out.

The race restarted on lap 24. The second caution of the race flew on lap 31 as a scheduled competition caution. Kyle Busch exited pit road with the lead after taking both right-side tires while Keselowski took four.

The race restarted on lap 36. After 26 laps, Keselowski, who restarted in eleventh, drove his way up to second. Denny Hamlin was running eighth when he made an unscheduled stop on lap 72. The reason for this was a flat right-front tire. To add insult to injury, he was tagged for speeding on pit road and was forced to serve a drive-through penalty. He rejoined the race in 40th two laps down. Debris in turn 4 brought out the third caution of the race on lap 80.

Second quarter
The race restarted on lap 89. Keselowski put pressure on Kyle Busch on lap 93. Busch just edged him out for the lead by eight one-thousandths of a second. Finally, Keselowski passed him in turn 3 and took back the lead on lap 96. The fourth caution of the race flew on lap 99 for a single car spin on the front stretch. Exiting turn 4, Kurt Busch got loose and spun down the track, through the grass, and came to a stop a few yards from the start/finish line.

The race restarted on lap 105. The fifth caution of the race flew on lap 122 for a single car wreck in turn 4. Riding the high line, Yeley made contact with the wall. Kyle Busch exited pit road with the lead after taking right-side tires. Keselowski exited tenth after about hitting one of his tire carriers who tripped carrying one of his old tires.

The race restarted on lap 129. Justin Allgaier was tagged for passing before crossing the start/finish line and was forced to serve a drive-through penalty. The sixth caution of the race flew for a single car wreck in turn 3. Going into the turn, Dale Earnhardt Jr. blew out his left-front tire and rode the wall through 3 and 4.

Second half

Halfway
The race restarted on lap 141. The seventh caution of the race flew on lap 143 for a three car wreck in turn 2. While trying to avoid Tony Stewart going into turn 1, Ricky Stenhouse Jr. got loose, tapped Jeb Burton, and sent him spinning. Stenhouse also made contact with the wall.

The race restarted on lap 147. Debris in turn 4 brought out the eighth caution of the race. Keselowski gave up second to pit under caution.

The race restarted on lap 157. Debris in turn 2 brought out the ninth caution of the race on lap 187. Ryan Newman opted not to put under the caution and assumed the lead. Keselowski lost time on pit road following a malfunction with one of his crew's airguns. "Yeah. It's easy to play the Saturday evening quarterback, but it just didn't come together for us," Keselowski said. "There are certainly some things I could have done better and we didn't have the best day on pit road. It's something to build off of, but I thought Kyle and I both had pretty good cars and we just didn't put it all together when it counted. We'll keep working on it."

The race restarted on lap 192. On old tires, Newman stood little chance and lost the lead to Kyle Busch on lap 193. The tenth caution of the race flew with 61 laps to go for a single car spin in turn 3. Going into 3, Earnhardt Jr. bumped into the rear of Danica Patrick and sent her into the wall. She retaliated by cursing him on the radio and ramming him on pit road. He was perplexed at the situation. "I mean, what am I supposed to say other than the truth?" Earnhardt said. "We didn't have any brakes going into the corner. I know better than to run into her because it gets so much attention. There wasn't nothing I could do. I mean, as hard as I hit her, what the hell did she think I was doing? Trying to wreck her? We ain't got no problem. It's not like we were having a problem out on the racetrack with her. It's not like I just drew her name out of a hat and decided she was the one I was going to run into tonight." Denny Hamlin exited pit road with the lead.

Fourth quarter

The race restarted with 55 laps to go. Carl Edwards went three wide underneath his teammate to take the lead with 54 laps to go. He got loose in turn 1 and Hamlin took back the lead with 53 laps to go. Kyle Larson made an unscheduled stop for a tire rub with 51 laps to go. Kyle Busch took back the lead with 50 laps to go. The left-rear tire rub on Kyle Larson's car wasn't fixed. It went flat and sent the car into the wall in turn 1. This brought out the eleventh caution of the race with 48 laps to go. This also set a new track record for cautions in a Sprint Cup Series race.

The race restarted with 43 laps to go. Joey Logano shot past Hamlin on the restart and took the lead with 42 laps to go. After stalking and swapping positions for a few laps, Kyle Busch finally took the lead back from Logano with 18 laps to go. He drove away from Logano to score his 31st career victory.

Post-race

Driver comments
"That right there is what we've got to do," Busch said. "Just to score as many points as we possibly can. To score those wins, that's what's going to get us to where we need to be. We led the most laps and we won the race, so that's all you can score. We'll just continue to push on and thrive." "Second just hurts, you know?" Logano said. "When you're that close to winning them, but we're still proud of what we did today. We had a fast car, we've improved our speed."

A number of drivers gave their thoughts on the success of the aero package. "They're close. The tire definitely could be a little softer. I wore one out just grinding on it, abusing it too much," said Denny Hamlin, who rallied from two laps down to finish third. "That's on me, but when you abuse a tire, you should not get rewarded for it. We've made our tires so dummy-proof over the last 10 years that anyone can just abuse them and abuse them with no consequence. I abused mine and I wore it out. That's what racing's all about. The drivers, our hands are uncuffed with this package. We're able to manhandle the cars and really be aggressive with it." Jeff Gordon, following his seventh-place finish in his final start at Kentucky Speedway, said that the tires aren't soft enough. "This is not the right tire," Gordon said. "It is still way too hard. It doesn't have near enough grip at the beginning of a run. It doesn't really fall off. The only way you can make a low-downforce package work is to have the proper tire on there. I'm glad we tried it, did a little more work, I'm looking forward to trying it again." "When the sun was out early when everybody's cars weren't dialed in yet, I mean that's the best racing we've had for a while, in my opinion," Carl Edwards said after finishing fourth. "It was when I started in this 10 or 12 years ago and it was really, really fun. Towards the end of the night, everybody got their cars working, the speeds picked up a little bit and you still got some of that spread-out, really hard to pass, but I'm telling you, this is the way we need to go. You let Goodyear, give them some time to build a tire for this, cut about half that spoiler off again, you're going to have some awesome racing."

Media reaction
{{quote box|quote="The first race with a new aerodynamic package featuring less down force provided plenty of reason for optimism. There appeared to be more passing for position mid-pack and drivers applauded the opportunity to race side-by-side and improve position. The battle between Kyle Busch and Joey Logano for the race lead and eventual win was as entertaining as anything seen all year. However, it's important to keep in mind this was simply the first step in creating an overall package for intermediate tracks. Goodyear will now have some time to produce a softer tire than what was used at Kentucky for the same rules package in place at Darlington on Labor Day weekend. While there was a race record 22 green flag passes for the lead once the lead car got in front many times they were able to check out. There's more work to be done but Saturday night was as good a first step as could be expected.|source=Motor Racing Network lead writer and co-host of The Morning Drive on Sirius XM NASCAR Radio Pete Pistone giving his thoughts on the new aero package.|width=40%|align=right}}
Members of the NASCAR media gave their thoughts on the first race with the new aero package. Pete Pistone, lead writer for the Motor Racing Network and co-host of the Sirius XM NASCAR Radio weekday program The Morning Drive'', described the package as having "provided plenty of reason for optimism," that he saw "more passing for position mid-pack," and that the battle for the win between Kyle Busch and Joey Logano "was as entertaining as anything seen all year."

Jeff Gluck of USA Today said that "by every measurable category – including the eye test – the debut of NASCAR's low downforce rules package Saturday night at Kentucky Speedway was a whopping success," and that the package "sure kicked ass..."

Lee Spencer of Motorsport.com said that "while it's too early to grade the new low downforce Sprint Cup package, Saturday night's Quaker State 400 was one of the best shows NASCAR has put on at an intermediate track in a long, long time."

Nate Ryan of NBC Sports described it as "the best Sprint Cup race of a 2015 season lacking for the sort of indelible moments that ran on a continuous loop Saturday night at Kentucky Speedway," and that "there was enough compelling evidence for a strong case the package should get another shot beyond the Southern 500 at Darlington Raceway."

Race results

Race statistics
13 lead changes among 8 different drivers
11 cautions for 49 laps
Time of race: 3 hours, 5 minutes, 42 seconds
Average speed: 
Kyle Busch took home $214,316 in winnings

Race awards
 Coors Light Pole Award: None
 3M Lap Leader: Kyle Busch (163 laps)
 American Ethanol Green Flag Restart Award: Kyle Busch
 Duralast Brakes "Bake In The Race" Award: Brad Keselowski
 Freescale "Wide Open": Matt Kenseth
 Ingersoll Rand Power Move: Ryan Newman (3 positions)
 MAHLE Clevite Engine Builder of the Race: Toyota Racing Development, #18
 Mobil 1 Driver of the Race: Kyle Busch (148.4 driver rating)
 Moog Steering and Suspension Problem Solver of The Race: Carl Edwards (crew chief Darian Grubb (0.302 seconds))
 NASCAR Sprint Cup Leader Bonus: No winner: rolls over to $150,000 at next event
 Sherwin-Williams Fastest Lap: Carl Edwards (Lap 148, 30.367)
 Sunoco Rookie of The Race: Brett Moffitt

Media

Television
NBC Sports had the television call for the race. Rick Allen, Jeff Burton, and Steve Letarte had the call in the booth for the race. Dave Burns, Mike Massaro, Marty Snider, and Kelli Stavast handled pit road for the television side.

Radio
PRN had the radio call for the race, which was simulcast on Sirius XM NASCAR Radio. Doug Rice, Mark Garrow, and Wendy Venturini called the race from the booth when the field went racing through the tri-oval. Rob Albright called the race from a billboard outside turn 1 when the field went racing through turns 1 & 2. Pat Patterson called the race from a billboard outside turn 4 when the field went racing through turns 3 & 4. Brad Gillie, Brett McMillan, Jim Noble, and Steve Richards worked pit road for the radio side.

Standings after the race

Drivers' Championship standings

Manufacturers' Championship standings

Note: Only the first sixteen positions are included for the driver standings.

References

Quaker State 400
Quaker State 400
NASCAR races at Kentucky Speedway